Islamic Reformism may refer to:
Islah, an Arabic word, usually translated as 'reform'
Islamic revival, revivalism of the Islamic religion within the Islamic tradition
Islamic Modernism, a historical movement emerged in the 19th century that attempts to reconcile Islamic faith with modernity
Liberalism and progressivism within Islam, a broad range of philosophy and movement that attempt to reconcile Islamic faith with liberalism or progressivism